Littoisten Työväen Urheilijat (abbreviated as LTU) is sports club from Littoinen, Finland.  The club was founded in 1932 and currently has five main sections covering football, volleyball, skiing, Women's Division and Veterans' Division. Football and volleyball are now the most popular sports in the club and keep-fit is another important activity that is organised. In total LTU has over 750 members.

Football

The club runs a number of teams including 3 men's teams, a veteran's team (Old Boys) and 3 junior teams.  The club's home ground is at the Littoisten kenttä.

2010 season

LTU Men's Team are competing in the Kolmonen administered by the Turku SPL.  This is the fourth highest tier in the Finnish football system.  In 2009 LTU finished in tenth position in their Kolmonen section.

LTU2 are participating in Upper Section – Summer (Kevät Ylälohko) of the Vitonen administered by the Turku SPL.

LTU3 are participating in Section 1 (Lohko 1) of the Kutonen administered by the Turku SPL.

References and sources
Official LTU Club Website
Official LTU Football Website
Finnish Wikipedia
Suomen Cup
Littoisten Työväen Urheilijat Facebook

Football clubs in Finland
1932 establishments in Finland